Hurşit Atak (born May 24, 1991) is a Turkish weightlifter competing in the −62 kg division. He is a native of Şırnak in southeastern Turkey. Currently, he is a member of the ASKİ Sports Club in Ankara.

Career
Hırşit Atak was born to a village guard father in Şırnak on May 23, 1991. He has fourteen siblings, one of them being his twin brother.

Atak became champion already at the national high school tournament held 2005 in Konya. In 2006, he became national champion in his age category in Aydın.

At the 2010 World Junior Championship held in Sofia, Bulgaria, he won three silver medals in the 62 kg division.
Atak won the silver medal in the Clean&Jerk category and the bronze medal lifting 289.0 kg in total at the 2011 European Championships in Kazan, Russia. At the 2012 Summer Olympics, he finished in 5th in the -62 kg division, with a total 302 kg.  He won the gold medal in Clean&Jerk and in total at the 2016 European Championships held in Førde, Norway.

Medals 

European Championships

World Junior Championships

References

External links 
 
 
 
 

1991 births
Sportspeople from Şırnak
Living people
Turkish male weightlifters
Olympic weightlifters of Turkey
Weightlifters at the 2012 Summer Olympics
Kurdish sportspeople
European champions for Turkey
European Weightlifting Championships medalists
21st-century Turkish people